The 2019 Atlantic City Blackjacks season was the only season for the Atlantic City Blackjacks in the Arena Football League. The Blackjacks played their home games at Boardwalk Hall and were coached by Ron James for the 2019 season.

Roster

Standings

Schedule

Regular season
The 2019 regular season schedule was released on February 13, 2019. All times Eastern.

Game summaries

References

Atlantic City Blackjacks
Atlantic City Blackjacks
Atlantic City Blackjacks